John Haines (1924–2011) was a poet laureate of Alaska.

John Haines may also refer to:

 John Haines (cricketer) (1825–1894), English first-class cricketer
 John Haines (priest), 17th-century Irish Anglican priest
 John Charles Haines (1818–1896), American politician, Mayor of Chicago, Illinois (1858–1860)
 John M. Haines (1863–1917), American politician, Governor of Idaho (1913–1915)
 John Peter Haines (1851–1921), president of the American Society for the Prevention of Cruelty to Animals
 John Sydney Haines (1937–2009), Australian boat builder and racer
 John Thomas Haines (c.1799–1843), English actor and dramatist

See also
 Jack Haines (John Thomas William Haines, 1920–1987), English international football (soccer) player
 John Hanes (disambiguation)
 John Haynes (disambiguation)